The Mustang SVO is a limited-production version of the third generation Ford Mustang sold from 1984 to 1986, with fewer than 10,000 built. Although it departed both physically and mechanically from any prior version of the Mustang, it held the same spot within the lineup, both in terms of performance over "lesser" variants and in prestige, as had variants such as the Shelby-tuned and "BOSS" Mustangs of the 1960s and 1970s.

History

The National Traffic and Motor Vehicle Safety Act of 1966, establishing the NHTSA and federal motor vehicle safety standards; National Environmental Policy Act of 1969, which paved the way for the EPA and emissions controls; and the 1973 and 1979 oil crises all dealt significant blows to demand for American muscle cars, which went extinct from rising fuel and insurance costs and more strict safety and emissions controls imposed worldwide. As a result, the "big three" automakers (Ford, General Motors, and Chrysler Corporation), for whom muscle cars had been a steady and reliable source of income, began to suffer financially. Many of the vehicles of the muscle car era had been either completely discontinued or had been detuned to help keep them in compliance with new federal emissions regulations and the rising demand for better fuel economy. In 1970, Henry Ford II withdrew all manufacturer support for racing programs. During the 1970s, although the Mustang continued in production, its performance and image had suffered greatly; diminished power output and Ford's inability to come up with an attractive body style in the post-fastback era were major issues.

Ford began to make a major push forward with the newly introduced Fox platform Mustang in 1979; by 1982, Ford had nearly completely reinvented every aspect of the vehicle, which included putting a new emphasis on the model's sporty nature. Just prior to this, in fall 1981, Ford decided to form a division that could oversee both the company's racing program and the production of limited-edition, high-performance, street-legal vehicles based on or taking technology from the race vehicles. Officially, the division was called the Special Vehicle Operations Department, but the public came to know them as simply SVO (S-V-O). SVO was led by Michael Kranefuss, who had previously headed the racing arm of Ford of Europe as director of motorsports, starting from 1972. SVO was expected to develop a limited-production passenger car, ostensibly to transfer the team's racing success to the streets, but ultimately also to help fund its operations with added revenue.

Tasked with developing something that was both plainly American and competent enough to compete with entry-level European sports cars of the day, the team began tuning the Mustang, deeming it the most obvious basis for a high-performance vehicle. The engineering team working on the new Mustang SVO was led by Glen Lyall; Bob Negstad handled chassis development. Ford President Donald Petersen called it "our most definitive effort on the American scene to put together the finest we have in the way of a smaller-displacement, higher-revving turbocharged kind of touring car".

At the same time, Ford had been working with Mazda to develop a proposed replacement for the Mustang, making plans to discontinue the Fox platform-based Mustangs, but enthusiasts protested and the joint Ford/Mazda sporty car was introduced eventually as the Ford Probe instead in 1988. Initial schedules had called for the SVO Special Mustang to be introduced as a 1982 model, but the confusion that resulted from the (temporary) cancellation of Fox platform Mustangs delayed the introduction of the Mustang SVO to a 1983 press event in northern California's Napa and Sonoma counties. That event included track time at the Sears Point Raceway. With Ford continuing to make year-to-year decisions about the discontinuation of the Fox platform Mustang, the SVO was seen as both a potential celebratory edition and a bridge to future turbocharged performance vehicles. List price for the 1984 Mustang SVO was  when it hit dealerships in mid-April 1984, more than double the price of a base Mustang. The Mustang GT was US$6,000 cheaper and proved to be quicker in a straight line.

By 1986, Ford again was considering dropping the Fox platform Mustang in favor of the Probe, so SVO shifted their attention to what would become the 1987 Ford Thunderbird Turbo Coupe (nicknamed the "Aerobird"). Total Mustang SVO production was 9,844, with most sold the first year: 4,508 (1984), 1,954 (1985), and 3,382 (1986).

Specifications

Turbocharged engine

Still ultimately concerned with issues such as fuel consumption and emissions, SVO engineers opted to pass over the production 5.0 liter Windsor V-8 fitted to the Mustang GT in favor of an detuned version of the turbocharged 2.3 liter Lima inline four racing engine, derived from the regular production engines originally used in the Pinto and Ford Mustang II. The use of a four-cylinder engine helped with weight distribution, due to the engine being installed perpendicular to and behind the front axle, thereby improving handling. However, the larger High Output 5.0L V8 in the Mustang GT/Capri RS was rated at  @ 4600 and  @ 3000 that year. Compared with the V8, the 2.3L SVO engine was  lighter. 

A factory-installed Hurst shifter was made standard to improve feel and quickness.

The vehicle's standard Borg-Warner T-5 five-speed manual transmission was updated then, as well, receiving revised gearing to match the new 3:73 rear end ratio.

Other upgrades

In addition to the advanced engine, the SVO featured several key modifications over the standard Mustang to help increase performance. The front suspension geometry was modified, 15:1 ratio power-assisted rack-and-pinion steering system replaced the standard system, a limited-slip, 3.45:1, 7.5" Traction-Lok rear axle was added for the first year of production (later models used a 3.73:1 ratio, 7.5" axle), a new, ventilated four-wheel-disc braking system (sourced from Fox platform cousin Continental Mark VII) replaced the GT's disc/drum setup (a first for the Mustang), specially designed pedals were used to aid heel-and-toe shifting and a six-shock KONI suspension system featuring specially tuned adjustable front struts, rear shocks, and horizontal rear dampers replaced the setup used on the Mustang GT. The KONI shocks had settings for "cross country" (front and rear), "GT" (front only), and "competition" (front and rear); the lateral rear shocks served to eliminate axle hop. Five-lug, 16 × 7-inch aluminum wheels with P225-50R16 tires were standard, as well; originally the SVO was fitted with German Goodyear NCT tires, which were changed later to Goodyear Eagle "Gatorback" tires; Chevrolet had signed an agreement with Goodyear for the Gatorback to be fitted exclusively in 1984 to the Corvette (C4), a competitor whose handling and performance was attributed to the tires.

The ventilated rear disc brakes, the five-lug hubs, the 16-inch (406 mm) wheels, the quad-shock rear end (early 84 units used a solid steel traction bar with a rubber cover), and the KONIs were used on the SVO before any other Mustang. Negstad tightened the shock valving in 1985 and again in 1986, noting "people assumed you were supposed to pay a little punishment for this love affair of driving this car. It can't be that comfortable!"

Styling
Interior was only available in charcoal grey (leather or cloth) and standard features included adjustable sport seats with lumbar supports and a leather-wrapped tilt steering wheel, shift lever, and emergency brake handle, which were not normally found on small American coupes. Just six major options were available: air conditioning, a cassette tape player, power door locks and windows, a flip-up sun roof, and leather seat trim.

The exterior had a unique front grille and hood that was only used on the SVO line; the front end was designed to accept both sealed beam headlamps and forthcoming aerodynamic lamps, and the hood had a functional scoop for the intercooler. In addition, the Mustang SVO had thinner side moldings, smoother sail panels behind the rear quarter windows, small rear wheel spats, and a biplane spoiler that was also unique to the SVO. The coefficient of drag was 0.39, dropping slightly to 0.38 with the new aerodynamic lights fitted to the 1985. The new "aero" headlights fitted to 1985 and 1986 models had been designed for the 1984 model, but regulations would not allow them to be used until the mid-1985 update. The pinstriped taillights introduced on the SVO were later reused on the 1993 Cobra model, as well. Only four colors were available for 1984: black, silver (metallic), red ("Medium Canyon Red"), and dark grey ("Dark Charcoal Metallic").

Performance and reception

According to Daniel Charles Ross of PM, "The total effect of the SVO reworking of the Mustang is a successful one, in looks and equipment. ... The vehicle's race car-like handling characteristics allow very little roll in hard cornering ... It's definitely a nice piece of work." In a follow-up comparison report for PM, the magazine called it "a kind of modern-day Shelby Mustang GT-350" but compared to the Mustang GT V8 that was included in the comparison, the SVO "delivers acceleration identical to the V8, 20 percent worse fuel economy and absolutely no low-speed torque" and concluded it was "unsuitable and dangerous on the street because the turbo power comes on so suddenly". The car that Ford had supplied for the comparison had shaved tire treads to enhance performance, so PM tested another example later, writing "the ride is really excellent for a sports car ... with 30 hp less than the Mustang GT V8, and much less weight in the nose, the SVO handles a lot better, too"; although there were several nuisances related to seating position and controls, PM concluded the Mustang SVO was "a commitment to high performance after so long a drought in Detroit. Not the irresponsible high performance of the muscle car era, but performance with fuel economy, brakes and handling."

References

External links
 
Standard Catalog of Ford 1903 2003 3rd Edition by John Gunnell
Mustang SVO on Facebook
SVO Club of America
SVO Registry
SVO Club of Pat
Ford Develops the Mustang SVO at Nelson Ledges

SVO